Gilberto Carlos Nascimento, commonly known as Betinho (born 14 June 1966), is a Brazilian football coach and former player who played as a midfielder. He is the current head coach of Luverdense.

Career statistics

Club

International

Honours

Player 
Cruzeiro
Supercopa Libertadores: 1992
Campeonato Mineiro: 1992

Shonan Belmare
Emperor's Cup: 1994
Asian Cup Winners' Cup: 1995

Manager 
Confiança
 Campeonato Sergipano: 2015

Awards
Japan Football League Best Eleven - 1993
J. League Best Eleven - 1994
Legend of Bellmare - 2003

References

External links

1966 births
Living people
Footballers from São Paulo
Association football midfielders
Brazilian footballers
Brazilian football managers
Brazil international footballers
Brazilian expatriate footballers
Campeonato Brasileiro Série A players
Campeonato Brasileiro Série C managers
Expatriate footballers in Japan
J1 League players
Japan Football League (1992–1998) players
Clube Atlético Juventus players
Cruzeiro Esporte Clube players
Sociedade Esportiva Palmeiras players
Shonan Bellmare players
Kawasaki Frontale players
Sport Club Internacional players
Guarani FC players
São José Esporte Clube players
Esporte Clube Santo André players
Ipatinga Futebol Clube players
Marília Atlético Clube managers
Guaratinguetá Futebol managers
Associação Desportiva Confiança managers
Agremiação Sportiva Arapiraquense managers
Fluminense de Feira Futebol Clube managers
Club Sportivo Sergipe managers
Associação Olímpica de Itabaiana managers
Nacional Atlético Clube (SP) managers
Sociedade Desportiva Juazeirense managers
Central Sport Club managers
Luverdense Esporte Clube managers